Winnipeg—Assiniboine was a federal electoral district in Manitoba, Canada, that was represented in the House of Commons of Canada from 1979 to 1988.

This riding was created in 1976 from parts of Portage, Winnipeg South and Winnipeg South Centre ridings

It was abolished in 1987 when it was redistributed into Winnipeg South, Winnipeg South Centre and Winnipeg—St. James  ridings.

Election results

See also 

 List of Canadian federal electoral districts
 Past Canadian electoral districts

External links 

Former federal electoral districts of Manitoba
Assiniboia, Winnipeg